Johan Karlberg (born 19 March 1984) is a Swedish born Chinese actor and is the first actor from Öland that had a career in Asia. He is known from Last Kung Fu Monk, The Resistance, and Marriage Cuisine.

Biography 

In early 2000s he went to Film school in Hvidovre Denmark for student film projects, and joined independent films in Canada, and also some web series in Detroit Michigan.

In 2007 he joined YouTube to make online auditions where he was discovered by a Chinese director. He kept working in China for six years from 2009 to 2014.

In 2010, he began his acting debut in the Chinese feature film "Last Kung Fu Monk" a martial art drama about a Shaolin monk that move to New York City and get involved with Russian Mafia. He played the part of "Oleg"he is the Russian mafia boss want to hire the monk to fight for him in an underground fight club. In the movie he worked with the former Shaolin Monk turned actor and director Peng Zhang Li and Chinese actress Hu Sang.

In 2011, he worked with Peng Zhang Li again in his second feature film "The Resistance". An Action Adventure Ninja movie that take place in World War II. He plays the role of "Schultz" he is the Nazi Commander that sign a deal with the Japanese General, and it's the role he is mostly famous for. The Chinese actress Hu Sang played the part of the Heroine Xiaoyun, and it's the 2nd film they worked together.

In 2014, his bad guy type cast was changed when he played the part of a sensitive Swedish professor in the South Korean - Chinese TV series "Marriage Cuisine", a romantic drama about a divorced woman who learn the hard way of single life difficulties.

Other roles he played are small parts of many famous Chinese war fiction dramas, he co worked with "Winston Chao" in the "Tian Xing Jian (TV Series)" and played the role of Lieutenant Collins in "Jue Ze" from 2012.

In 2020s Johan continued with acting in Macau, he played his first star role of Sebastian in the 2021 Macanese rotoscoping film "Macao 2525". He made his directing debut in the Blade Runner inspired movie “The Edge Of human“ where he played the role of an Android hunter with a troublesome past.

Filmography

References
 Stranger in a Strange Land Interview with Johan Karlberg

External links 

Movie Douban Filmography (Chinese)
Ciné Séries (French)

Chinese male actors
1984 births
Living people
21st-century Chinese actors
Chinese film actors
Chinese television actors